Electric eye is an opto-electronic means of sensing.  It may also refer to:
 Electric Eye (album), a 1984 album by Prodigal
 Electric Eye (video), a 2003 compilation DVD by Judas Priest
 Electric Eye (song), a 1982 song by Judas Priest
 Electric Eye (song), a 2017 song by Celldweller
 Electric Eye (band), a Psych-rock band from Norway